Booker Taliaferro McDaniels (September 13, 1913 – December 12, 1974) was an American baseball pitcher in the Negro leagues. He played from 1940 to 1946, and again in 1949 with the Kansas City Monarchs. He also played for the Los Angeles Angels of the Pacific Coast League in 1949 and 1950. McDaniels died of throat cancer.

References

External links
 and Seamheads
Negro League Baseball Players Association
Biography at Arkansas Baseball Encyclopedia

1913 births
1974 deaths
Kansas City Monarchs players
Los Angeles Angels (minor league) players
Baseball players from Arkansas
Deaths from oral cancer
Deaths from cancer in Missouri
20th-century African-American sportspeople
Baseball pitchers